Nowa Ruda  is a town in south-western Poland near the Czech border, lying on the Włodzica river in the central Sudetes mountain range.  it had 22,067 inhabitants. It is the seat of the rural district of Gmina Nowa Ruda, but is not part of its territory (the town is a separate urban gmina in its own right).

History

Under Polish and Bohemian rule
A medieval village situated in the rich Kłodzko Valley, Nowa Ruda developed in the mid-13th century as part of the Kingdom of Bohemia. German-speaking immigrants settled there as part of the Ostsiedlung. The oldest known mention of the settlement comes from 1337 from a document issued in nearby Kłodzko, when it was part of the Piast-ruled Duchy of Ziębice/Münsterberg under the suzerainty of the Bohemian (Czech) Crown of the Holy Roman Empire. It passed directly to Bohemia in the next decades. Officially, the settlement was granted a city charter in 1363 and received the name of Newenrode. In the Late Middle Ages, weaving, clothmaking and shoemaking developed in the town. In the years 1427-1429 the town was invaded by the Hussites. The city was rechartered under a local variant of the Magdeburg Law in 1434 and then again in 1596. From 1459 it was part of the Bohemian-ruled County of Kladsko. The city was invaded and devastated again during the Thirty Years' War in 1622.

Under Prussia and Germany
In 1742 it passed to Prussia, and from 1871 to 1945 it was also part of Germany. In the second half of the 19th century the town developed due to coal mining and the textile industry. In 1884 it suffered a great fire. After World War I, it suffered an economic crisis. The town was no longer a district seat after 1932, when it was reincorporated into the Landkreis Glatz (Kłodzko district). During World War II, the Germans established three labour units for French, Belgian and Soviet prisoners of war, as well as two forced labour camps. Also during the war, the largest mining disaster in the town's history took place; 187 miners were killed.

After World War II
Following the defeat of Nazi Germany in World War II the region became part of Poland, and the town took on its present name, with the German population being expelled in accordance to the Potsdam Agreement. It was repopulated by Poles, expellees from former eastern Poland annexed by the Soviet Union, settlers from central Poland and miners returning from France. In 1973 the settlement of Słupiec was included within the town limits as a new district. In 1976 and 1979 mining disasters occurred, in which 17 and 7 miners respectively died. After the adoption of Ostpolitik by the German Chancellor Willy Brandt, the former German inhabitants were allowed to travel to their hometowns and tried to establish relations with the current population and the Holy See redrew the boundaries of the ecclesiastical provinces along the post-war borders. On 28 June 1972 the Catholic parishes of Nowa Ruda were transferred from the traditional Hradec Králové diocese (est. 1664; Ecclesiastical Province of Bohemia) to the Archdiocese of Wrocław.

The area was notable in the Middle Ages as a source of rich iron ore deposits. Until 2000 there was also a coal mine and a gabbro mine in Nowa Ruda's borough of Słupiec.

Transport
There is a train station in Nowa Ruda. The Voivodeship roads 381, 384 and 385 pass through the town.

Sport
Piast Nowa Ruda is the local multi-sports club.

Literary Heights Festival

The Literary Heights Festival, a Polish literary festival founded in 2015 which takes place in the vicinity of Gmina Nowa Ruda at the foot of the Owl Mountains in the Kłodzko Valley.

The event's organizers include the Mount Babel Cultural Association, the city and commune of Nowa Ruda, while the hosts are Karol Maliszewski and Olga Tokarczuk. The festival's program includes educational sessions, debates, concerts, panels, shows, meetings, poetry, literary workshops, film screenings, culinary workshops and various exhibitions.

Notable people
Franz Eckert (1852–1916), composer
Joachim von Pfeil (1857–1924), German explorer 
Friedrich Kayßler (1874–1945), actor and writer
Joseph Wittig (1879–1949), German theologian and writer
 (1892–1953), politician
Friedrich-Wilhelm Otte (1898–1944), Wehrmacht general
 (1913–1992), writer
Gero Trauth (born 1942), painter, graphic artist, porcelain illustrator and designer
Edyta Geppert (born 1953), singer
 (born 1956), actor
 (born 1960), poet
Olga Tokarczuk (born 1962), writer, Nobel laureate
Robert Więckiewicz (born 1967), actor

Twin towns – sister cities

Nowa Ruda is twinned with:

  Broumov, Czech Republic
  Castrop-Rauxel, Germany
  Wallers, France

References

External links

  Online radio and hottest news website
  Private Internet Wortal of Nowa Ruda
  Nowa Ruda online – citizens' site

 
Cities in Silesia
Cities and towns in Lower Silesian Voivodeship
Kłodzko County